John Zernhelt (born January 4, 1954) is an American football coach. He is an offensive analyst at Ferrum College in Ferrum, Virginia, a position he has held since 2022. Zernhelt served as the head football coach at The Citadel for one season, in 2004, compiling a record of 3–7. Zernhelt was a scout for the Los Angeles Rams of the National Football League (NFL) for six years.

Head coaching record

References

External links
 Ferrum profile

1954 births
Living people
American football offensive linemen
The Citadel Bulldogs football coaches
Ferrum Panthers football coaches
East Carolina Pirates football coaches
James Madison Dukes football coaches
Los Angeles Rams scouts
Marshall Thundering Herd football coaches
Maryland Terrapins football coaches
Maryland Terrapins football players
New York Jets coaches
Rice Owls football coaches
South Carolina Gamecocks football coaches
Tennessee Titans coaches
Sportspeople from Pottsville, Pennsylvania
Coaches of American football from Pennsylvania
Players of American football from Pennsylvania